Indrawati III Hydropower Station (Nepali: इन्द्रावती ३ जलविद्युत आयोजना) is a run-of-river hydro-electric plant located in  Sindhupalchok District of Nepal. The flow from Indrawati River, a tributary of Sunkoshi River, is used to generate 7.5 MW electricity with annual energy of 50 GWh. The design flow is 14 m3/s and design gross head is 65 m.  The plant is owned and developed by National Hydropower Company Limited, an IPP of Nepal. The plant started generating electricity since 2059-06-21 BS. The generation licence will expire in 2104-09-29 BS, after which the plant will be handed over to the government. The power station is connected to the national grid and the electricity is sold to Nepal Electricity Authority.

See also
List of power stations in Nepal

References

Hydroelectric power stations in Nepal
Gravity dams
Run-of-the-river power stations
Dams in Nepal
Irrigation in Nepal
2002 establishments in Nepal
Buildings and structures in Sindhupalchowk District